Jalgpalliklubi Tallinna Sadam (Port of Tallinn Football Club) was an Estonian football club that existed from 1991 until 1998. The club won the Estonian Cup in 1996 and 1997 and were Estonian Meistriliiga runners up in 1997–1998 and 1998 seasons. Before the 1999 season, Sadam merged with Levadia Maardu, under the name of Levadia Maardu (Levadia Tallinn since 2004).

Achievements
Estonian Cup: (2)
1995–96, 1996–97

Estonian SuperCup: (1)
1996–97

Tallinna Sadam in Estonian Football

Tallinna Sadam in Europe
 1Q = 1st Qualifying Round
 2Q = 2nd Qualifying Round

References

External links
JK Tallinna Sadam  at weltfussballarchiv

Sadam Tallinn
Sadam Tallinn
Football clubs in Tallinn
1991 establishments in Estonia
1999 disestablishments in Estonia
Association football clubs established in 1991
Association football clubs disestablished in 1999